Fairfield is the name of some places in the U.S. state of New Jersey:

 Fairfield Township, Cumberland County, New Jersey
 Fairfield Township, Essex County, New Jersey
 Fairfield, Monmouth County, New Jersey

See also 
 Fairfield Township (disambiguation)

New Jersey township disambiguation pages